Taliepus nuttallii, known generally as the southern kelp crab or globose kelp crab, is a species of true crab in the family Epialtidae. It is found in the East Pacific.

References

Further reading

 

decapods
Articles created by Qbugbot
Crustaceans described in 1840